Foullah Edifice Football Club is a football (soccer) club from Chad based in N'Djamena. They had a few Chadian national team players, like Mbaya Brice, Massama Asselmo, Ferdinand Gassina and Hassan Hissein.

The club's colours are sky blue and white.

History
Foullah Edifice won the national championship in 2011, 2013 and 2014. In 2011, they played in a Cup and Supercup final, which they lost to RFC. They also have one cup title from 2014 and one Cup de Ligue title from 2010. In 2015 the club finished in 4th position in first division. At the end of 2016, the club transferred its player Esaie Mayakamon Allafi to Cameroonian side Coton Sport Garoua.

Crest

Stadium

Stade Omnisports Idriss Mahamat Ouya, also named Stade Nacional, is a multi-purpose stadium located in N'Djamena, Chad. It is currently used mostly for football matches.  The stadium holds 20,000 people. It is currently the home ground of the Chad national football team. It is named after former Chadian highjumper Mahamat Idriss (1942—1987).

Achievements
Chad Premier League : 2
 2011, 2013, 2014

Chad Cup: 1
 2014.

Coupe de Ligue de N'Djaména: 1
 2010.

Chad Super Cup: 0

Performance in CAF competitions
CAF Champions League: 1 appearance
2012 – Preliminary Round

CAF Confederation Cup: 1 appearance
2011 – First Round

Current squad

Managers

2010, 2011 –  Emmanuel Boukar
2015 –  Djindo Manadji Samuel

References

External links
Team profile – leballonrond.fr

Football clubs in Chad